MX Puppis (MX Pup) is a class B1.5IV (blue subgiant) star in the constellation Puppis. Its apparent magnitude varies irregularly between magnitude 4.6 and 4.9 and it is classified as a Gamma Cassiopeiae variable. It is approximately 930 light years away based on parallax.

It is a γ Cas variable, ranging from 4.92 to 4.60 magnitude.

References

Puppis
B-type subgiants
Be stars
Puppis, MX
Gamma Cassiopeiae variable stars
CD-35 4349
3237
068980
040274
Puppis, r